Gorak Shep or Gorakshep is a small settlement that sits on the edge of a frozen lakebed covered with sand in Nepal with the same name. It is found at an elevation of  elevation, near Mount Everest.  The village is not inhabited year-round.

Even though trekking lodges at Gorak Shep are basic, in recent times more modern amenities have become available, such as satellite high-speed internet access.

Trekking
Gorak Shep is inside the Sagarmatha National Park, the homeland of the Sherpa people, famous for their skills as guides and mountaineers. It is the final stop on most common treks to Everest Base Camp from Lukla, following what the Dalai Lama dubbed "the steps to heaven."

This route takes trekkers from Lukla to Namche Bazaar, Tengboche, Pangboche, Dingboche, Lobuche, and on to Gorak Shep.  Most trekkers stay overnight there, as their trekking permits will not allow them to camp at Everest Base Camp.  

Also, Gorak Shep provides the best "launching pad" for an ascent of Kala Patthar, which looks like a giant dune looming over the lakebed. For many trekkers, summitting Kala Patthar, with its 5,550 meters (18,209 ft), provides both the best views of Everest and the highest altitude that most will reach without a climbing permit, which must be obtained in Kathmandu, at the Nepal Mountaineering Association.

Climbing starts in the early morning, when the visibility is usually better. It takes four hours to summit and come back. Gorak Shep was the original Everest Base Camp, being used by the Swiss mountain climbers in their attempt to climb the Everest in 1952. Later the camp was moved closer to the mountain, just below the Khumbu Ice Fall. Climbing time from Gorak Shep to the Everest Base Camp ranges from 1.5 to 2.5 hours, depending on the weather, acclimatization and physical conditioning of each individual. 
At this altitude, few people feel comfortable and many start to suffer symptoms of altitude sickness or acute mountain sickness (AMS).

Climate
The best times for trekking are in spring (March and April) and autumn (October and November), when the visibility of the mountain is ideal and the temperature is not excessively cold. However, in autumn the competition for bed spaces in the lodges can be intense, though normally trekkers are allowed to sleep on the floor of the dining room lodge.

During the winter, in the months from December to February, it is possible to do trekking, but the vast majority of accommodations are closed, the trails are snow-covered and the cold is very intense. 
Gorak Shep means "dead ravens," because of the complete lack of any kind of vegetation in this place.

Panoramic view

See also 
 La Rinconada, Peru - the highest elevation year-round human habitation in the world at 5,100 m (16,730 feet).

References

External links 

Images from Gorak Shep and Everest
Gorak Shep Holidays 

Himalayas
Lakes of Koshi Province
Populated places in Solukhumbu District